The Imperial State of Iran, also known as the Imperial State of Persia, was the official name of the Iranian state under the rule of the Pahlavi dynasty.

It was formed in 1925 and lasted until 1979, when the Pahlavis were overthrown as a result of the Islamic Revolution, which abolished Iran's continuous monarchy and established the present-day Islamic Republic of Iran. The Pahlavi dynasty was founded in 1925 by Reza Shah, a former brigadier-general of the Persian Cossack Brigade. His reign lasted until 1941, when he was forced to abdicate by the Allies of World War II following the Anglo-Soviet invasion of Iran. He was succeeded by his son, Mohammad Reza Pahlavi, who was the last Shah of Iran.

The Pahlavis came to power after Ahmad Shah Qajar, the last Iranian ruler under the Qajar dynasty, proved unable to stop encroachments on Iranian sovereignty by the United Kingdom and the Soviet Union, had his position extremely weakened by a military coup, and was formally removed from power by parliament while he was in France. Iran's Majlis, convening as a constituent assembly on 12 December 1925, deposed the young Ahmad Shah Qajar and declared Reza Shah as the new shah of the Imperial State of Persia. In 1935, Reza Shah asked foreign delegates to use the endonym Iran instead of the exonym Persia when addressing the country in formal correspondence.

Following the 1953 Iranian coup d'état, which was backed by the United Kingdom and the United States, Mohammad Reza Pahlavi's rule became more autocratic and firmly aligned with the Western Bloc during the Cold War. In correspondence with this reorientation of Iran's foreign policy, the country became an ally of the United States in order to act as a bulwark against Soviet ideological expansionism, and this gave the Shah the political capital to enact a hitherto unprecedented socio-economic program that would transform all aspects of Iranian life through the White Revolution. Consequently, Iran experienced prodigious success in all indicators, including literacy, health, and standard of living. However, by 1978, the Shah faced growing public discontent that culminated into a full-fledged popular revolutionary movement led by religious cleric Ruhollah Khomeini. Mohammed Reza Pahlavi went into exile with his family in January 1979, sparking a series of events that quickly led to the end of monarchic Iran, and the establishment of the Islamic Republic of Iran on 11 February 1979. Following Mohammed Reza Pahlavi's death in 1980, his son, Reza Pahlavi, now leads the exiled family throne.

History

Establishment

In 1925, Reza Khan, a former Brigadier-General of the Persian Cossack Brigade, deposed the Qajar dynasty and declared himself king (shah), adopting the dynastic name of Pahlavi, which recalls the Middle Persian language of the Sasanian Empire. (He had chosen the last name Pahlavi for himself in November 1919.) By the mid-1930s, Reza Shah's strong secular rule caused dissatisfaction among some groups, particularly the clergy, who opposed his reforms, but the middle and upper-middle class of Iran liked what Rezā Shāh did. In 1935, Rezā Shāh issued a decree asking foreign delegates to use the term Iran in formal correspondence, in accordance with the fact that "Persia" was a term used by Western people for the country called "Iran" in Persian. His successor, Mohammad Reza Pahlavi, announced in 1959 that both Persia and Iran were acceptable and could be used interchangeably.

Reza Shah tried to avoid involvement with the UK and the Soviet Union. Though many of his development projects required foreign technical expertise, he avoided awarding contracts to British and Soviet companies because of dissatisfaction during the Qajar Dynasty between Persia, the UK, and the Soviets. Although the UK, through its ownership of the Anglo-Iranian Oil Company, controlled all of Iran's oil resources, Rezā Shāh preferred to obtain technical assistance from Germany, France, Italy and other European countries. This created problems for Iran after 1939, when Germany and Britain became enemies in World War II. Reza Shah proclaimed Iran as a neutral country, but Britain insisted that German engineers and technicians in Iran were spies with missions to sabotage British oil facilities in southwestern Iran. Britain demanded that Iran expel all German citizens, but Rezā Shāh refused, claiming this would adversely affect his development projects.

World War II

Iran claimed to be a neutral country during the opening years of World War II. In April 1941, the war reached Iran's borders when Rashid Ali, with assistance from Germany and Italy, launched the 1941 Iraqi coup d'état, sparking the Anglo-Iraqi War of May 1941. Germany and Italy quickly sent the pro-Axis forces in Iraq military aid from Syria but during the period from May to July the British and their allies defeated the pro-Axis forces in Iraq and later Syria and Lebanon.

In June 1941, Nazi Germany broke the Molotov–Ribbentrop Pact and invaded the Soviet Union, Iran's northern neighbor. The Soviets quickly allied themselves with the Allied countries and in July and August 1941 the British demanded that the Iranian government expel all Germans from Iran. Reza Shah refused to expel the Germans and on 25 August 1941, the British and Soviets launched a surprise invasion and Reza Shah's government quickly surrendered after less than a week of fighting. The invasion's strategic purpose was to secure a supply line to the USSR (later named the Persian Corridor), secure the oil fields and Abadan Refinery (of the UK-owned Anglo-Iranian Oil Company), and limit German influence in Iran. Following the invasion, on 16 September 1941 Reza Shah abdicated and was replaced by Mohammad Reza Pahlavi, his 21-year-old son.

During the rest of World War II, Iran became a major conduit for British and American aid to the Soviet Union and an avenue through which over 120,000 Polish refugees and Polish Armed Forces fled the Axis advance. At the 1943 Tehran Conference, the Allied "Big Three"—Joseph Stalin, Franklin D. Roosevelt, and Winston Churchill—issued the Tehran Declaration to guarantee the post-war independence and boundaries of Iran.

On 13 September 1943 the Allies reassured the Iranians that all foreign troops would leave by 2 March 1946. At the time, the Tudeh Party of Iran, a communist party that was already influential and had parliamentary representation, was becoming increasingly militant, especially in the North. This promoted actions from the side of the government, including attempts of the Iranian armed forces to restore order in the Northern provinces. While the Tudeh headquarters in Tehran were occupied and the Isfahan branch crushed, the Soviet troops present in the Northern parts of the country prevented the Iranian forces from entering. Thus, by November 1945 Azerbaijan had become an autonomous state helped by the Tudeh party. This pro-Soviet nominal-government fell by November 1946, after support from the United States for Iran to reclaim the regions that declared themselves autonomous.

At the end of the war, Soviet troops remained in Iran and established two puppet states in north-western Iran, namely the People's Government of Azerbaijan and the Republic of Mahabad. This led to the Iran crisis of 1946, one of the first confrontations of the Cold War, which ended after oil concessions were promised to the USSR and Soviet forces withdrew from Iran proper in May 1946. The two puppet states were soon overthrown and the oil concessions were later revoked.

Cold War

Mohammad Reza Pahlavi replaced his father on the throne on 16 September 1941. He wanted to continue the reform policies of his father, but a contest for control of the government soon erupted between him and an older professional politician, the nationalistic Mohammad Mosaddegh.

In 1951, the Majlis (the Parliament of Iran) named Mohammad Mossadegh as new prime minister by a vote of 79–12, who shortly after nationalized the British-owned oil industry (see Abadan Crisis). Mossadegh was opposed by the Shah who feared a resulting oil embargo imposed by the West would leave Iran in economic ruin. The Shah fled Iran but returned when the United Kingdom and the United States staged a coup against Mossadegh in August 1953 (see 1953 Iranian coup d'état). Mossadegh was then arrested by pro-Shah army forces.

Following the overthrow of Mossadegh, Iran became steadfastly geopolitically aligned with the United States. During the presidential term of John F. Kennedy, the United States saw Iran as an important ally in the region due to perceiving it as a rare source of stability in the Middle East.

Major plans to build Iran's infrastructure were undertaken, a new middle class began flourishing and in less than two decades Iran became the indisputable major economic and military power of the Middle East.

On 12–16 October 1971, an elaborate set of celebrations and festivities for the 2,500-year celebration of the Persian Empire occurred in commemoration of the founding of the Achaemenid Empire by Cyrus the Great.

Collapse of the Monarchy

The Shah's government suppressed its opponents with the help of Iran's security and intelligence secret police, SAVAK. Such opponents included leftists and Islamists.

By the mid-1970s, relying on increased oil revenues, Mohammad Reza began a series of even more ambitious and bolder plans for the progress of his country and the march toward the "White Revolution". But his socioeconomic advances increasingly irritated the clergy. Islamic leaders, particularly the exiled cleric Ayatollah Ruhollah Khomeini, were able to focus this discontent with an ideology tied to Islamic principles that called for the overthrow of the Shah and the return to Islamic traditions, called the Islamic revolution. The Pahlavi regime collapsed following widespread uprisings in 1978 and 1979. The Islamic Revolution dissolved the SAVAK and replaced it with the SAVAMA. It was run after the revolution, according to U.S. sources and Iranian exile sources in the US and in Paris, by Gen. Hossein Fardoust, who was deputy chief of SAVAK under Mohammad Reza's reign, and a friend from boyhood of the deposed monarch.

Mohammad Reza fled the country, seeking medical treatment in Egypt, Mexico, the United States, and Panama, and finally resettled with his family in Egypt as a guest of Anwar Sadat. On his death, his son Reza Pahlavi, who was formally invested as Crown Prince on 26 October 1967, succeeded him as head of the Pahlavi dynasty. Reza Pahlavi and his wife live in the United States in Potomac, Maryland, with three daughters.

As of 2013, Reza Pahlavi established the National Council of Iran in Paris, which serves as a government in exile to reclaim the former throne after a potential overthrow of the current Islamic Republic government. However, in February 2019, Pahlavi launched an initiative called the Phoenix Project of Iran. According to the National Interest, this is "designed to bring the various strains of the opposition closer to a common vision for a post-clerical Iran."

Politics

The political system of the Imperial State of Iran took place in a parliamentary constitutional monarchy where the Shah served as the head of state and the prime minister as its head of government.

The National Consultative Assembly was the nation's unicameral parliament, from 1949 it became the lower house when the Senate was established as its upper house of the parliament.

Legacy
Under the Qajar dynasty the Persian character of Iran was not very explicit. Although the country was referred to as Persia by westerners, and the dominant language in court and administration was Persian, the dichotomy between pure Persian and Turkic elements had remained obvious until 1925. The Pahlavi rule was instrumental in Iran's nationalisation in line with Persian culture and language which, among other ways, was achieved through the official ban on the use of minority languages such as Azerbaijani and the successful suppression of separatist movements. Reza Shah is credited for the reunification of Iran under a powerful central government. The use of minority languages in schools and newspapers was not tolerated. The succeeding regime – the Islamic Republic of Iran – has adopted a more inclusive approach in relation to the use of ethnic minorities and their language, however the issues as to Azeris, Iran's largest ethnic minority, remain and pose considerable challenges for the unity and territorial integrity of Iran.

Human rights

The rulers of the Imperial State of Iran – Reza Shah Pahlavi and his son Mohammad Reza Shah Pahlavi – employed secret police, torture, and executions to stifle political dissent. The Pahlavi dynasty has sometimes been described as an "Imperial dictatorship" or "one-man rule". According to one  history of the use of torture by the Iranian government, the abuse of prisoners varied at times during the Pahlavi dynasty. Additionally, the country enjoyed a brief interlude of democracy from 1946 to 1953..

Corruption 

Manouchehr Ganji led an anti-corruption study group which submitted at least 30 reports in 13 years detailing corruption of high-ranking officials and the royal circle, but the Shah called the reports "false rumors and fabrications". Parviz Sabeti, a high-ranking official of SAVAK believed that the one important reason for successful opposition to the regime was the allegations of corruption.

See also

 Pahlavi dynasty
 History of Iran
 List of kings of Persia
 List of Shia dynasties

Notes and references

Pahlavi dynasty
Monarchy in Persia and Iran
Former monarchies of Asia
Iranian royalty
Political history of Iran
1920s in Iran
1930s in Iran
1940s in Iran
1950s in Iran
1960s in Iran
1970s in Iran
States and territories established in 1925
States and territories disestablished in 1979
1925 establishments in Iran
1979 disestablishments in Iran
Iranian Revolution
20th century in Iran
Empires and kingdoms of Iran